R523 road may refer to:
 R523 road (Ireland)
 R523 road (South Africa)